Killer Under a Blood Moon is the second extended play by Australian musician Dan Sultan. Released in May 2018, the EP sees Dan Sultan working with Australian musicians to recreate songs from his previous studio album Killer. The EP concludes with two glam-bent bonus tracks, both offcuts from Killer.

Sultan said the EP came together quite naturally. "I'm always writing new music. The idea to work with other artists and rebuild a couple tracks came up, which I found really interesting and exciting. I sent out some text messages and they all said yes. It's great to have new music out there."

In an interview with Canberra Times, Sultan said the artists he chose to work with on this EP are his favourite artists. He said he felt lucky that everyone was available and everyone was willing.

At the ARIA Music Awards of 2018, the album was nominated for two awards; ARIA Award for Best Male Artist and Best Independent Album.

Reception
Jai Price from Music Insight said: "Bursting at the seams with something for everyone, Dan Sultan's EP is like a party mix of lollies; you don't know what you'll pull out each time you reach in, but it has a high chance of being delicious".

Track listing

Charts

Release history

References

2018 EPs
EPs by Australian artists
Dan Sultan albums
Liberation Records albums